Deylavand may refer to:

Deylavand-e Olya
Deylavand-e Sofla